C. Jackson "Jack" Grayson, Jr. (October 8, 1923 – May 4, 2017) was the chairman of APQC, dean of two business schools, head of the U.S. Price Commission (1971), a farmer, newspaper reporter and FBI agent. In 1977 he founded APQC as a private sector, non-profit organization.

C. Jackson Grayson was the U.S. chairman of the Price Commission in the United States from 1971 to 1973 under President Richard Nixon.  In that position under the Economic Stabilization Act of 1970, Grayson oversaw price controls and the process through which companies request permission to increase prices. Grayson gained exposure to productivity issues and how they related to product pricing. Grayson went on to found the American Productivity and Quality Center in 1977 where he resided as chairman and oversaw the organization's public education improvement initiatives.

Professional experience

Education
B.B.A., Tulane University, 1944

M.B.A., Wharton School of the University of Pennsylvania, 1947

D.B.A., Harvard Business School, 1969

Academic career
 Instructor: School of Business Administration, Tulane University, 1947–1949
 Asst. Professor: School of Business Administration, Tulane University, 1953–1955
 Asst. Professor: Graduate School of Business Administration, Harvard University, 1958–1959
 Associate Professor: School of Business Administration, Tulane University, 1959–1963
 Associate Dean: School of Business Administration, Tulane University, 1961–1963
 Professor:  IMDE:International Institute for Management Development, Management Development Institute, Switzerland, 1963–1964
 Visiting Professor: Graduate School of Business, Stanford University, Spring 1967
 Dean and Professor: School of Business Administration, Tulane University, 1963–1968
 Visiting Professor: INSEAD, Management Development Institute, Fontainebleau, France, Summers 1972, 1973, 1975
 Dean and Professor: School of Business Administration, Southern Methodist University, 1968–1975

Positions
 Certified Public Accountant, Louisiana, 1943–present
 Newspaper reporter, New Orleans Item, 1949–1950
 Special Agent, Federal Bureau of Investigation, Washington, D.C., 1950–1952
 Farm Manager, C. J. Grayson Farm, (cotton, cattle, soybeans) Fort Necessity, Louisiana, 1952
 Partner, James E. O'Neill & Associates, an export-import business, New Orleans, 1953
 Asst. to the Vice President for Development, Tulane University, New Orleans, 1953–1955
 Chairman, U.S. Price Commission, Washington, D.C., 1971–1973
 Chairman, American Productivity & Quality Center, 1975–present
 Consultant Panel, Comptroller General of the United States, 1978–1991
 Member of three Presidential Commissions:
 President Richard Nixon: U.S. Price Commission, 1971
 President Carter: Commission for a National Agenda for the 80's, 1980
 President Reagan: National Productivity Advisory Committee, 1982
 Retired member of the Board of Directors for Lever Bros., Sun Company, Overhead Door, Tyler Corporation, Whitman Corporation, Potlatch Corporation, Oryx Energy, Harris Corporation, Infomart, Browning-Ferris Industries
 Member of Board of Directors, Global Alliance for Transnational Education

Bibliography

Articles and Monographs
Grayson has written over 60 monographs, papers, and articles in various publications.

Books
 Decisions Under Uncertainty: Drilling Decisions by Oil and Gas Operators, Division of Research, Harvard Business School, Harvard University, Boston, 1960
 Confessions of a Price Controller, Dow Jones-Irwin, Homewood, Illinois, 1974
 American Business: A Two-Minute Warning, co-authored with Carla O'Dell, The Free Press, New York, 1988
 If Only We Knew What We Know, co-authored with Carla O'Dell, The Free Press, New York, 1998

Awards
 2000	Named by Teleos, an English research firm, as one of the 10 “Most Admired Knowledge Leaders” in North America.
 2003	The American Society for Quality (ASQ) awards Grayson its Distinguished Service Medal. The medal honors the lifetime contribution of any person who has been recognized as a long-term enabler, catalyst or prime mover in the quality movement.
 2006	Southern Methodist University names an endowed MBA scholarship in entrepreneurial studies and an annual faculty innovation award in Grayson's honor.

References

External links 
 APQC
 Open Standards Benchmarking
 Malcolm Baldrige National Quality Award (NIST)
 Public School Insights Interview with Grayson

1923 births
2017 deaths
American businesspeople
American business theorists
American economics writers
American male non-fiction writers
Quality experts
People from Franklin Parish, Louisiana
Harvard Business School alumni
Tulane University alumni
Wharton School of the University of Pennsylvania alumni
Federal Bureau of Investigation agents